Steven Woznick (born October 14, 1949) is a former American cyclist. He competed in the 1000m time trial at the 1972 Summer Olympics.

References

1949 births
Living people
American male cyclists
Olympic cyclists of the United States
Cyclists at the 1972 Summer Olympics
Pan American Games medalists in cycling
Pan American Games gold medalists for the United States
Pan American Games bronze medalists for the United States
Cyclists at the 1975 Pan American Games